Steve Smear (born May 18, 1948) is a former defensive end and linebacker for the Montreal Alouettes of the Canadian Football League.  He was a CFL All-Star in 1970 and was a part of a Grey Cup victory for the Alouettes.

He was named an All-American defensive tackle in 1968 while playing at Penn State University.

He was awarded the Nils V. "Swede" Nelson Award in 1968.

He was inducted into the Pennsylvania Sports Hall of Fame in 2013.

References

External links
1970 GREY CUP ENGRAVING
CFLAPEDIA BIO
FANBASE BIO
Pennsylvania Sports Hall of Fame

1948 births
Living people
American players of Canadian football
Players of American football from Pennsylvania
American football defensive linemen
Canadian football defensive linemen
Canadian football linebackers
Montreal Alouettes players
Penn State Nittany Lions football players
Saskatchewan Roughriders players
Toronto Argonauts players
Sportspeople from Johnstown, Pennsylvania